Charles A. Williams (March 8, 1934 – December 27, 2020) was an American college football coach who served as the head football coach at Canisius College for five seasons.

Williams coached at North Tonawanda High School, the University at Buffalo, and Buffalo State College before arriving at Canisius in 1992, serving as the defensive coordinator for three seasons under coach Barry Mynter. Following Mynter's resignation at the end of the 1994 season, Williams was named head coach of the Golden Griffins. Williams served as head coach at Canisius from 1995 to 1999, compiling a record of 16–34. Following a 1–10 season in 1999, the worst season in school history to date, Williams resigned as head coach of the Golden Griffins. After his resignation at Canisius, Williams was named tight ends coach at the University at Buffalo for the 2000 season.

Williams died on December 27, 2020, at the age of 86.

Head coaching record

References

1934 births
2020 deaths
Buffalo Bulls football coaches
Buffalo State Bengals football coaches
Canisius Golden Griffins football coaches